Solista Pero No Solo (Soloist But Not Alone) is the debut album by Puerto Rican salsa singer Frankie Ruiz following his departure from Tommy Olivencia's band. The album reached #1 on the Tropical Album chart which made Ruiz the first solo performer to achieve this feat.

Track listing
 Ahora Me Toca a Mí - 4:20
 Esta Cobardía - 5:40
 Como le Gusta a Usted - 4:12
 Tú Con Él - 5:00 
 La Cura - 4:55
 El Camionero - 5:22
 Si Esa Mujer Me Dice Que Sí - 4:28
 Amor de Un Momento - 4:41

Chart position

Reception

José A. Estévez Jr. of Allmusic gave the album a positive review his debut album praising that it "has attitude, fun, and Ruiz's joyful vocal skills to boot".

See also
List of number-one Billboard Tropical Albums from the 1980s

References

1985 debut albums
Frankie Ruiz albums
Rodven Records albums